Uchku (Quechua for hole, pit, also spelled Uchco) is a mountain in the Andes of Peru which reaches a height of approximately . It is located in the Ancash Region, Ocros Province, on the border of the districts of Carhuapampa and Rajan.

References 

Mountains of Peru
Mountains of Ancash Region